Takifugu alboplumbeus, sometimes known as the grey-spotted puffer, is a species of pufferfish in the family Tetraodontidae. It is a marine species native to the Indo-Pacific that reaches 23 cm (9.1 inches) SL. It is known to be highly toxic.

References 

alboplumbeus
Fish described in 1845